Jackson Township is a township in Nevada County, Arkansas, United States. Its total population was 105 as of the 2010 United States Census, a decrease of 41.34 percent from 179 at the 2000 census.

According to the 2010 Census, Jackson Township is located at  (33.597099, -93.158403).

References

External links 

Townships in Arkansas
Nevada County, Arkansas